Jeanne Herscher-Clément (Vincennes, 1878 - Givry, 1941) was a French pianist and composer. In 1922 she provided the music for a staging of La Mort de Souper a farce by Roger Semichon originally published in 1913 after the 16th Century farce La Condamnation de Banquete by Nicole de La Chesnaye.

Works
Song cycle Le bestiaire du paradis. "Le furet" ; "La truite" ; "Le coq et la poule" ; "L'araignée" ; "Le chat" ; "La reine des abeilles" ; "La huppe" ; "La chouette" ; "Le petit singe" ; "Les martins-pêcheurs" ; "La mouche" ; "Le psaume du merle".　Recording by Céline Ricci (soprano) and Daniel Lockert (piano) 2012.

References

20th-century French women classical pianists
1878 births
1941 deaths
People from Vincennes